The Municipality of Mežica is a municipality in the traditional region of Carinthia in northern Slovenia. The seat of the municipality is the town of Mežica. Mežica became a municipality in 1994.

Settlements
In addition to the municipal seat of Mežica, the municipality also includes the following settlements:
 Breg
 Lom
 Onkraj Meže
 Plat
 Podkraj pri Mežici

References

External links

Municipality of Mežica on Geopedia
Mežica municipal site

Mežica
1994 establishments in Slovenia